Kevin Keller is a fictional character in the Archie Comics universe. He premiered in Veronica #202, published in September 2010. Created by writer/artist Dan Parent, Kevin is the first gay character in Archie Comics history. He is portrayed by Casey Cott on Riverdale.

Character description and publication history

In Keller's initial storyline, "Isn't It Bromantic?", Veronica expresses interest in dating Kevin but he is uninterested. As he and Jughead bond over their mutual love of food, Kevin explains that he does not want to date Veronica because he is gay. Kevin also bonds with Veronica and they become best friends.

Archie Comics co-CEO Jon Goldwater explained that including an openly gay character is a way to open up the world of Riverdale and de-stigmatize homosexuality. "Archie's hometown of Riverdale has always been a safe world for everyone. It just makes sense to have an openly gay character in Archie comic books." Veronica writer Dan Parent concurred, saying "It shows that Riverdale is in the 21st century."

Keller returned in Veronica #205 and headlined his own four-issue miniseries, Kevin Keller, beginning in June 2011. The new series focused on Keller's life before he arrived in Riverdale, including his struggles in junior high school. It also establishes that he is an Army brat and introduces the characters Wendy and William, friends whom Keller had been previously seen texting.

In July 2011, Archie Comics announced that Keller would star in his own ongoing solo title, also titled Kevin Keller. The new series debuted in February 2012 and featured Keller becoming class president while also dealing with "adversity". The series ended in November 2014 after 15 issues.

In April 2015, Archie Comics announced that Kevin Keller would headline another solo series, Life with Kevin. It would be a digital-first mini-series to start with the option to become an ongoing series if successful. The series will bring back creator Dan Parent as writer/artist as well as J. Bone as inker. The series will not take place in Archie Comics' "New Riverdale", instead being set in the classic Archie universe and focusing on an older Kevin who has moved to New York City after graduating from college. The series debuted in June 2016.

Other versions

Afterlife with Archie
Kevin appears in the second issue of Afterlife with Archie. He is shown to be a skilled archer as well as having received military training from his father who died before the series began.

Life with Archie: The Married Life
Keller first appeared as an adult in issue #16 (January 2012) of Life with Archie: The Married Life where his marriage to Clay Walker was shown. Later, after Walker is shot in a robbery attempt, Keller runs for and wins election to the United States Senate on a platform of stricter gun control legislation; the series concludes with Archie Andrews' death saving the newly elected Senator Keller from an assassination attempt.

In other media

 Kevin appears in Riverdale, a drama series for The CW portrayed by Casey Cott. His character featured in a recurring role for the first season, he was then promoted to regular cast for the next season.
 Cott reprises the role in the episode "Chapter Ten: Gloria" from the first season of Katy Keene, a spin-off of Riverdale.

Reception

Kevin Keller's first appearance in Veronica #202 proved so popular that the issue sold out, prompting Archie Comics to issue a reprint for the first time in its history.

Gay & Lesbian Alliance Against Defamation then-president Jarrett Barrios praised Kevin's creation. "It’s thrilling to see Riverdale High welcome its first openly gay student, and give readers a window into the lives of gay youth today. As images of gay and transgender people become more frequent on TV and in film, people are embracing and expect to see images of our community across media platforms, including comic books." Parent was nominated for a GLAAD Media Award in 2011 for creating Kevin.

Parent has reported that fan reaction to Keller has been overwhelmingly favorable. "Not everybody's particularly happy about it, but from where I'm sitting it's been about 98% positive." He has noted the number of gay fans who have approached him at personal appearances to express their appreciation and explain what a difference a character like Keller would have made to them as they were growing up.

Collected editions 
The series has so far been assembled into the following collections:

Trade paperbacks

References

External links

Archie Comics

Comics characters introduced in 2010
Archie Comics characters
Fictional gay males
GLAAD Media Award for Outstanding Comic Book winners
LGBT characters in comics
Fictional LGBT characters in television
LGBT-related comics
Fictional United States senators
Male characters in comics
Male characters in television
Teenage characters in comics
Teenage characters in television